Sally Carroll  is an American sports shooter.  She was on the United States national sport shooting team.

She competed at the ISSF 10 meter air pistol, winning a gold medal in 1970, gold medal in 25 Meter Center-Fire Pistol, and bronze medal in 1979.

She advised Pattie Dench. She was a US Army Major.

References 

American female sport shooters